The Bishops Avenue, London N2, connects the north side of Hampstead Heath at Kenwood (Hampstead Lane), Hampstead to East Finchley and is on the boundary between the London Boroughs of Barnet and Haringey. It is considered to be one of the wealthiest streets in the world. The road is often referred to by its nickname of "Billionaires' Row".

The 66-house street runs downhill north–south and with the parallel Winnington Road displays a variety of architectural styles. Average property prices on the avenue surpassed £1 million in the late 1980s and each property occupies a 2–3-acre plot. In 2006, the smallest houses in the street were selling for £5 million while a larger house, Turkish tycoon Halis Toprak's  Toprak Mansion, sold amidst great secrecy to the president of Kazakhstan, Nursultan Nazarbayev, for £50 million in January 2008, making it one of the most expensive houses in the world, as listed by Forbes magazine. Homes on the street are on the market for up to £65 million.

Together with Winnington Road and Ingram Avenue, it is named after Arthur Winnington-Ingram, who as Bishop of London owned much of the surrounding area following a land grant in 1904. Most of the land was sold privately in the early 20th century, and today only one house on the road is owned by the Church (46, The Bishops Avenue) and a nearby residential home.

The Bishops Avenue is home to monarchs, business magnates, and celebrities. An estate agent for the area, Trevor Abrahmsohn, said in 2006: "Among the wealthiest circles in the world."

The Guardian revealed in 2014 that in total 16 of the properties (an estimated worth of £350 million) are derelict and have not been lived in for several decades. According to one resident, perhaps only three of the houses are occupied on a full-time basis. Most of the properties in the most expensive part of the avenue are registered to companies in tax havens including the British Virgin Islands, Curaçao, the Bahamas, Panama, and the Channel Islands, allowing international owners to avoid paying stamp duty on the purchase and to remain anonymous.

Residents
Owners of houses on the street include the Sultan of Brunei and members of the House of Bolkiah, publisher and newspaper magnate Richard Desmond, art collector and philanthropist Poju Zabludowicz, industrialist Lakshmi Mittal, and property tycoon Andreas Panayiotou.

Former residents of the street have included Iraqi businessman Nemir Kirdar, Sir Billy Butlin, Dame Gracie Fields, Katie Boyle, Sir Peter Saunders (producer of the play The Mousetrap), the businessmen Asil Nadir and Emil Savundra and Heather Mills (the former wife of Paul McCartney), who owned an apartment there. Ten of the houses on the street owned by the House of Saud were sold for £73 million.

References

External links
  The relative plot size between The Bishops Avenue and Winnington Road, the parallel road to the west is striking.
 Barnet Council Planning applications.  Full documentation, usually including detailed plans, is available for decisions since 2006.  (Public userid/password: barnet/barnet).
 Alison Beard, Billionaire's Boulevard, Financial Times, 22 June 2007.

Bishop's Avenue
Streets in the London Borough of Haringey